Blacks in Colorado Hall of Fame is a collaboration between Denver Public Library and Denver Public Schools to honor African American Coloradans who were the first in their field to accomplish a professional goal and/or who have actively supported the African American community while achieving their goal.

The original series contained forty-one photographs and was created in 1973 as part of a cooperative venture for Black Awareness Month between the Denver Public Library and the Denver Public Schools. In 1985, as part of the Ford-Warren Branch Library’s 10th Anniversary Celebration, an additional four black Coloradoans were inducted into this Hall of Fame. Since then, every other year at least one is entered into the Hall of Fame Series.

Inductees

References 

Halls of fame in Colorado
Lists of people from Colorado
Lists of African-American people
State halls of fame in the United States
African Americans in Colorado